How Many Ways may refer to:

 "How Many Ways", a song from Between Us (Murray Head album), 1979
 "How Many Ways", a theme song of the television series Rules of Engagement by Señor Happy
 "How Many Ways", a 2018 song by Keith Sweat
 "How Many Ways", a 1994 single by Toni Braxton